Oh Yong-nam (born 10 September 1960) is a North Korean former footballer. He represented North Korea on at least sixteen occasions between 1989 and 1992, scoring once.

Career statistics

International

International goals
Scores and results list North Korea's goal tally first, score column indicates score after each North Korea goal.

References

External links
 

1960 births
Living people
North Korean footballers
North Korea international footballers
Association football defenders
Footballers at the 1990 Asian Games
1992 AFC Asian Cup players
Asian Games competitors for North Korea